The Cenél Loairn, the descendants of Loarn mac Eirc, controlled parts of northern Argyll around the Firth of Lorne, most probably centred in Lorne but perhaps including the islands of Mull and Colonsay, Morvern and Ardnamurchan. The boundary to the east was the Druim Alban mountain ridge that separated Dál Riata from Pictland. The chief places of the kingdom appear to have been at Dun Ollaigh, near Oban and Dunadd near Crinan. The chief religious site may have been on Lismore, later the seat of the High Medieval bishop of Argyll.

Descendants of Loarn
Several kings of Dál Riata were members of the Cenél Loairn, and thus claimed descent from Loarn : 
Ferchar Fota
Ainbcellach mac Ferchair
Selbach mac Ferchair
Dúngal mac Selbaig
Muiredach mac Ainbcellaig

In High Medieval times the Mormaers of Moray claimed descent from Loarn:
Findláech mac Ruaidrí
Máel Coluim mac Máil Brigti
Gille Coemgáin mac Máil Brigti
Mac Bethad mac Findláich (also king of Alba)
Lulach mac Gille Coemgáin (also king of Alba)
Máel Snechtai mac Lulaich
Óengus

Notes

References

 Bannerman, John, Studies in the History of Dalriada. Scottish Academic Press, Edinburgh, 1974. 
 Pestano,Dane, King Arthur in Irish Pseudo-Historical Tradition - An Introduction. Dark Age Arthurian Books, 2011.  
 Broun, Dauvit, The Irish Identity of the Kingdom of the Scots in the Twelfth and Thirteenth Centuries. Boydell, Woodbridge, 1999. 
 Menzies, Gordon (ed) (1971) Who are the Scots: A search for the origins of the Scottish nation. BBC. 
 Woolf, Alex, From Pictland to Alba, 789-1070 Edinburgh University Press, 2007.

Kings of Dál Riata
Medieval Gaels from Scotland